Desmond Dillon (1926 – 24 November 1964) was an Irish hurler and handballer who played as a centre-forward for the Offaly, Dublin and Clare senior teams.

Born in Lisdoonvarna, County Clare, Dillon first played competitive hurling during his schooling at the Cistercian College, Roscrea. He arrived on the inter-county scene at the age of twenty when he first linked up with the Offaly senior team, before later lining out with the Dublin and Clare sides. He made his senior debut in the 1946 championship. Dillon went on to enjoy a sporadic career over the next decade, and won one Oireachtas medal. He was an All-Ireland runner-up as a non-playing substitute on one occasion.

Dillon represented the Combined Universities, Munster and Leinster inter-provincial teams at various times, winning one Railway Cup medal in 1955. At club level he won two championship medals with Birr before later winning a third championship medal with University College Dublin.

With University College Dublin Dillon also won four Fitzgibbon Cup medals.

His retirement came following the conclusion of the 1955 Oireachtas Championship.

Dillon also earned renown as a handballer, winning Munster medals and representing Ireland at the World Handball Championships.

Honours

Player

Birr
Offaly Senior Club Hurling Championship (2): 1944, 1946

University College Dublin
Dublin Senior Club Hurling Championship (1): 1948
Fitzgibbon Cup (4): 1948 (sub), 1950, 1951, 1952

Dublin 
Leinster Senior Hurling Championship (1): 1948 (sub)

Clare
Oireachtas Cup (1): 1954

Munster
Railway Cup (1): 1955

References

1926 births
1964 deaths
Birr hurlers
People educated at Cistercian College, Roscrea
UCD hurlers
Offaly inter-county hurlers
Dublin inter-county hurlers
Clare inter-county hurlers
Munster inter-provincial hurlers
Leinster inter-provincial hurlers